Ottawa Torah Institute is a Yeshiva high school for boys located in Ottawa providing secular and Judaic education. Founded in 1982, it is Ottawa's first and only full-time Jewish high school.  In 1990 the high school expanded to include a girls division, known as Machon Sarah.  Graduates from Ottawa Torah Institute earn an Ontario Secondary School Diploma (OSSD), and have moved on to some of the finest Universities, Yeshivas, and Seminaries in the world.

History
In 1981, Rabbi Reuven Bulka brought a Jewish educational program from Yeshivas Chofetz Chaim to Machzikei Hadas synagogue. In 1982, this was followed by Rabbis Yisroel Morgenstern and Yaakov Deitsch of Yeshivas Chofetz Chaim, opening a Yeshiva High School for boys and establishing OTI as Ottawa's first full-time Jewish high school for boys. Rabbi Eliezer Ben-Porat was head of school for twenty five years. The school was later run by the team of Rabbi Yaakov Moshe Harris (from 2013 to 2019) and Rabbi Dovid Mandel (from 2013 - 2018). It was headed by Rabbi Baruch Dov Perton. from 2018-2021. Rabbi Michael Fine now heads it (2021-present).

See also
List of schools in Ottawa

External links
 

Jews and Judaism in Ottawa
Schools in Ottawa
Jewish schools in Canada